Events in the year 2017 in Azerbaijan.

Incumbents
 President: Ilham Aliyev
 Vice President: Mehriban Aliyeva (starting 21 February)
 Prime Minister: Artur Rasizade

Events

January

March

May

June

August

September

October

December

Deaths
19 January – Jalal Allakhverdiyev, mathematician (b. 1929).

Gallery

References

 
Years of the 21st century in Azerbaijan
Azerbaijan
Azerbaijan
Azerbaijan
2010s in Azerbaijan